Ronald Raymond Cowell (born December 14, 1946) is a former Democratic member of the Pennsylvania House of Representatives.

References

Democratic Party members of the Pennsylvania House of Representatives
Living people
1946 births
People from Philipsburg, Centre County, Pennsylvania